Titus Elva (born 5 February 1974) is a Saint Lucian retired footballer, who played as a striker.

International career
Elva represented Saint Lucia at the international level over a span of 13 years, scoring 17 goals.

Personal life
He is the father of Caniggia Elva, who plays internationally for Canada. His brother, Oliver, also played for Saint Lucia as a defender.

Career statistics
Scores and results list Saint Lucia's goal tally first, score column indicates score after each Elva goal.

References

External links

1974 births
Living people
Saint Lucian footballers
Association football forwards
Saint Lucia international footballers